Hedum castellum was an ancient city located in central Bosnia, in the modern-day town of Breza, Bosnia and Herzegovina. The city was also the capital of the Illyrian tribe Daesitiates. Today, only the Basilica and some grave tombs remain.

References 

Ancient Roman buildings and structures in Bosnia and Herzegovina
Illyrian archeological sites and structures in Bosnia and Herzegovina
Roman fortifications in Roman Dalmatia
Illyrian Bosnia and Herzegovina